Charlotte Atkinson (born 29 November 1996) is a Manx swimmer. She competed in both the women's 100 and 200 m butterfly events at the 2017 World Aquatics Championships.

References

External links

1996 births
Living people
British female swimmers
Place of birth missing (living people)
Swimmers at the 2014 Summer Youth Olympics
Manx swimmers
Commonwealth Games competitors for the Isle of Man
Swimmers at the 2018 Commonwealth Games
Female butterfly swimmers
European Aquatics Championships medalists in swimming
Competitors at the 2019 Summer Universiade